Shane White (born 1970) is an American illustrator, comic book writer and artist and author from Massena, New York.

Career

Comics
Shane White's earliest comic work appeared in small-press comics in the mid-80s. His first professional penciling gig was for Silverwolf Comics' (Greater Mercury Comics) Eradicators in 1990. Several years later he did work for DC/Paradox's Big Book of Urban Legends. In 1998 Caliber Comics hired him along with Martin Powell to adapt Whitley Strieber's Communion book, of which two of the four issues were ultimately finished. His first graphic novel North Country, a 96-page full-color memoir published by NBM Publishing, reveals the hard-scrabble life of living in a blue-collar mill town in upstate New York. In his second graphic novel Things Undone, we follow Rick Watts a videogame artist who struggles with falling out of love with his girlfriend, his job and with life, turning him into a zombie. BRAUN, his third graphic novel, is about Maven, a girl and her highly advanced robot protector. When he's kidnapped by a powerful corporation she and her friends have to break him free but find a secret that will change the face of humanity.

Illustration and writing
Among White's other notable works as an illustrator, storyboard artist, concept artist and comic book writer and artist for various entertainment industries:
 Illustrator: Munchkin: Pathfinder Artist Edition 2017 Steve Jackson Games
 Writer: Amazon Rapids Text-based stories for kids 2016 Amazon
 Illustrator: Lord of the Rings: War of the North 2014 Warner Bros. Interactive
 Storyboard & Concept Artist: Star Wars Kinect 2011 Microsoft Games
 Artist: Tori Amos Comic Book Tattoo Anthology 2008 Image Comics 11-page story written by Jessica Staley inspired by the song Devils & Gods.
 Co-Creator/Artist: The Overman Books I-V 2008 Image Comics written by Scott Reed
 Illustrator: Cryptic Science: The Big Squirm by Kevin J. Anderson & Rebecca Moesta 2007 Adventure Boys Inc.
 Illustrator: Cryptic Science: The Secret of Groom Lake by S. Arthur Hart 2007 Adventure Boys Inc.
 Illustrator: Blue Squadron: Big Splash by Loren L. Coleman 2007 Adventure Boys Inc.
 Illustrator: Blue Squadron: The Shores of Tripoli by Loren L. Coleman 2007 Adventure Boys Inc.
 Story Writer: Negative Burn #7 2006 Desperado Publishing Volstagg: Barbarian Cop
 Story Artist/Adapter: Negative Burn #2 2006 Desperado Publishing Bog Man (adapted from Jessica Staley's 10 minute play)
 Writer & Artist: Fear Agent: Eye of Chaos Issue #7 2006 Image Comics 8-page back-up story

Bibliography
 White, Shane. BRAUN 2017 Studiowhite Productions. 
 White, Shane. Things Undone 2009 NBM Publishing. 
 White, Shane. North Country 2005 NBM Publishing.

External links
 —Personal
 —Professional
 
 Interview on The Pulse Voyaging to the North Country with Shane White by Chris Burnham 9/3/2005

American comics writers
American comics artists
American cartoonists
1970 births
Living people